One More Once is a 1994 album by the Latin jazz pianist Michel Camilo.

Track listing 
"One More Once" (Michel Camilo)-4:50
"Why Not!" (Michel Camilo)-6:42
"The Resolution" (Michel Camilo)-3:30
"Suite Sandrine, Pt. 3" (Michel Camilo)-9:14
"Dreamlight" (Michel Camilo)-8:47
"Just Kidding'" (Michel Camilo)-5:17
"Caribe" (Michel Camilo)-7:04
"Suntan" (Michel Camilo)-5:57
"On the Other Hand" (Michel Camilo)-5:49
"Not Yet" (Michel Camilo)-6:08

Personnel 
Michel Camilo – Piano
Chris Hunter – Alto Saxophone
Paquito D'Rivera - Alto Saxophone
Ralph Bowen – Tenor Saxophone
Craig Handy – Tenor Saxophone
Gary Smulyan – Baritone Saxophone
Jon Faddis – Trumpet
Michael Mossman – Trumpet
Stanton Davis, Jr. – Trumpet
Brian Lynch – Trumpet
Ryan Kisor – Trumpet
Dave Bargeron – Trombone
Conrad Herwig – Trombone
Ed Neumeister – Trombone
Douglas Purviance – Trombone
David Taylor – Trombone
Chuck Loeb – Electric Guitar
Giovanni Hidalgo – Percussion, Bongos, Conga, Timbales
Guarionex Aquino – Percussion, Bongos, Tambourine, Chekere, Guiro
Cliff Almond – Drums
Marvin "Smitty" Smith – Drums
Anthony Jackson – Bass Guitar

External links 
 Michel Camilo Discography

References

1994 albums
Michel Camilo albums
Columbia Records albums